Charles Thomas Shields (October 20, 1922 – October 18, 1955) was an American Negro league pitcher in the 1940s.

A native of Whipple, West Virginia, Shields made his Negro leagues debut in 1941 with the New York Cubans and Chicago American Giants. He remained with Chicago in 1942 and 1943. Shields also pitched for the Homestead Grays during their 1943 Negro World Series championship season, posting a 3–0 record in five appearances. He died in Scarbro, West Virginia in 1955 at age 32.

References

External links
 and Seamheads

1922 births
1955 deaths
Chicago American Giants players
Homestead Grays players
New York Cubans players
Baseball pitchers
Baseball players from West Virginia
People from Fayette County, West Virginia
20th-century African-American sportspeople